The 2016 Men's EuroHockey Club Champions Trophy was the 40th edition of the Men's EuroHockey Club Champions Trophy, Europe's secondary club field hockey tournament organized by the European Hockey Federation. It was held from 13 to 16 May 2016 at the Glasgow National Hockey Centre in Glasgow, Scotland.

Cardiff & Met won their first title by defeating Banbridge 4–0 in the final. The hosts Kelburne won the bronze medal by defeating Slavia Prague 3–0.

Qualified teams
The following seven teams participated in the tournament.

 Cardiff & Met
 Banbridge
 Kelburne
 Slavia Prague
 Rotweiss Wettingen
 Bra
 Minsk

Preliminary round

Pool A

Pool B

Classification round

Fifth place game

Third place game

Final

Final standings
 Cardiff & Met
 Banbridge
 Kelburne
 Slavia Prague
 Rotweiss Wettingen
 Bra
 Minsk

See also
2015–16 Euro Hockey League
2016 Women's EuroHockey Club Trophy

References

Men's EuroHockey Club Trophy
Club Champions Trophy
International field hockey competitions hosted by Scotland
EuroHockey Club Champions Trophy
EuroHockey Club Champions Trophy
2010s in Glasgow
International sports competitions in Glasgow